EXMARaLDA (Extensible Markup Language for Discourse Annotation) is a set of free software tools for creating, managing and analyzing spoken language corpora. It consists of a transcription tool (comparable to tools like Praat or Transcriber), a tool for administering corpus meta data and a tool for doing queries (KWIC searches) on spoken language corpora. EXMARaLDA is used for doing conversation and discourse analysis, dialectology, phonology and research into first and second language acquisition in children and adults. EXMARaLDA is based on the open standards XML and Unicode and programmed in Java.

References

 Schmidt, Thomas and Wörner, Kai (2009). "EXMARaLDA – Creating, analysing and sharing spoken language corpora for pragmatic research." In: Pragmatics 19.
 Schmidt, Thomas and Bennöhr, Jasmine (2008). "Rescuing Legacy Data." In: Language Documentation and Conservation 2, 109–129.

External links
 exmaralda.org - Official project website
 std.metu.edu.tr - Website of the METU Spoken Turkish Corpus, a corpus constructed with EXMARaLDA

Free science software
Phonetics
Phonology
Free audio software
Linguistic research software